Monkey grass is a common name for several plants used in landscaping and may refer to:

Plants in the genus Liriope
Ophiopogon japonicus, native to China, India, Japan, and Vietnam